Goth Angel Sinner is the twelfth extended-play and first posthumous EP release by American recording artist Lil Peep, released on October 31, 2019, by AUTNMY via Columbia Records. The songs on the EP serve as singles for Everybody's Everything. The project was initially announced in October 2017 on Peep's Twitter account, one month before his death. After his death, the project was delayed indefinitely until October 2018 when the EP was leaked online and then released for streaming in October 2019.

Background
The EP was recorded shortly after Peep's first solo tour The Peep Show in Los Angeles, between stints in London, England, where he also recorded Come Over When You're Sober, Pt. 1 and Pt. 2.  All 3 tracks from the EP were featured in the Everybody's Everything compilation. A remixed version of the song "When I Lie" with Ty Dolla Sign was included on the Game of Thrones companion soundtrack, For the Throne.

Track listing
All tracks are written by Lil Peep alongside producer Fish Narc..

References

2019 EPs
Lil Peep albums
Hip hop EPs